His Highness Prince Devawongse Varodaya, formerly known as Traidos Prabandh (11 September 18835 February 1943) was a former Thai Minister of Foreign Affairs and privy councillor.

Biography 
He was born the son of Prince Devawongse Varopakarn and Mom Lamai Devakula na Ayudhya, and was born as HSH Prince Traidos Prabandh Devakula. He served as the Siamese Minister to Washington D.C. between 1912 and 1913, then served as the Ambassador to Denmark between 1914 and 1921 while also concurrently acting as the Ambassador to Germany between 1913 and 1917. On 28 June 1919, he and Prince Jarunsakdi Kridakara were the Siamese representatives to Versailles at the end of the First World War. There, they signed the Treaty of Versailles on behalf of Siam.

During the reign of King Rama VI, he was elevated to His Highness (Phra Ong Chao) Prince Traidos Prabandh on 11 November 1922. When his father the Prince Devawongse Varopakarn died, he took his place as the Minister of Foreign Affairs on 29 June 1923. He was further elevated to the rank of Kromma Muen on 8 November 1929 as the Prince Devawongse Varodaya with a sakdina of 11000 rai, and was made a privy councillor on 21 October 1931

He was removed from his position as Minister of Foreign Affairs following the Siamese Revolution of 1932. On 5 February 1943 he died at 59 years of age. He was granted a royal cremation at Wat Debsirin on 7 April 1943.

Marriage 
Prince Devawongse Varodaya married Pian Bunnag. They had 12 children:
 Mom Rajawongse Pantip Devakula, m. Chubhotbongs Paribatra, Prince of Nakhon Sawan
 Mom Rajawongse Tuaythep Devakula
 Mom Rajawongse Devathai Devakula
 Mom Rajawongse Chandararat Devakula
 Mom Rajawongse Theparit Devakula
 Mom Rajawongse Chalermviman Devakula m. Mom Rajawongse Chidhin Kashemsri
 Mom Rajawongse Chitrakup Devakula
 Mom Rajawongse Subhakand Devakula
 Mom Rajawongse Yanthep Devakula
 Mom Rajawongse Ratritos Devakula m. HSH Yuthithian Svastivatana
 Mom Rajawongse Chantas Tritos Devakula
 Mom Rajawongse Patana Tritos Devakula

Ancestry

References 

1883 births
1943 deaths
Thai male Phra Ong Chao
Ministers of Foreign Affairs of Thailand
Devakula family
19th-century Chakri dynasty
20th-century Chakri dynasty